The ORCID (Open Researcher and Contributor ID) is a nonproprietary alphanumeric code to uniquely identify authors and contributors of scholarly communication as well as ORCID's website and services to look up authors and their bibliographic output (and other user-supplied pieces of information).

This addresses the problem that a particular author's contributions to the scientific literature or publications can be hard to recognize as most personal names are not unique, they can change (such as with marriage), have cultural differences in name order, contain inconsistent use of first-name abbreviations and employ different writing systems. It provides a persistent identity for humans, similar to tax ID numbers, that are created for content-related entities on digital networks by digital object identifiers (DOIs).

Uses
ORCID aims to provide a persistent code for humans, to address the problem that a particular author's contributions to scholarly communication can be hard to recognize as most personal names are not unique and thus multiple persons of the same name could contribute to the same scholarly field, even from the same institutional department. Further, names can change (such as with marriage); there are cultural differences in name ordering conventions; journals make inconsistent use of first-name abbreviations, name suffixes, and middle initials; and employ different writing systems.

The ORCID organization, ORCID Inc., offers registered users to maintain "a constantly updated ‘digital curriculum vitae’ providing a picture of his or her contributions to science going far beyond the simple publication list," hosted by ORCID, edited by the user.

Development and launch

ORCID was first announced in 2009 as a collaborative effort by publishers of scholarly research "to resolve the author name ambiguity problem in scholarly communication". The "Open Researcher Contributor Identification Initiative" - hence the name ORCID - was created temporarily prior to incorporation.

A prototype was developed on software adapted from that used by Thomson Reuters for its ResearcherID system. ORCID, Inc. was incorporated as an independent nonprofit organization in August 2010 in Delaware, United States of America, with an international board of directors. Its executive Director, Chris Shillum, was appointed in September 2020; he succeeded the founding ED, Laurel Haak, who was appointed in April 2012. From 2016, the board is chaired by Veronique Kiermer of PLOS (the former chair was Ed Pentz of Crossref). ORCID is freely usable and interoperable with other ID systems. On 16 October 2012, ORCID launched its registry services and started issuing user identifiers.

Adoption
 On 15 November 2014, ORCID announced the one-millionth registration.
 On 20 November 2020, ORCID announced the ten-millionth registration.
 , the number of live accounts reported by ORCID was 14,727,479.
To encourage others to join them in supporting the adoption of ORCID, an open letter dated 1 January 2016 was crafted with "publishers that signed this open letter committed to requiring ORCID iDs following specific implementation standards."

In a 2021 update to the Springer Nature website, they noted that they would thenceforth "support verifying and crediting your [peer] review activity directly from our manuscript submission systems to ORCID."

Identifiers

Formally, ORCID IDs are specified as URIs, for example, the ORCID ID for Josiah S. Carberry (a fictitious professor whose ID is used in examples and testing) is https://orcid.org/0000-0002-1825-0097 (both https:// and http:// forms are supported; the former became canonical in November 2017). However, some publishers use the short form, e.g. "ORCID: 0000-0002-1825-0097" (as a URN).

ORCID IDs are a subset of the International Standard Name Identifier (ISNI), under the auspices of the International Organization for Standardization (as ISO 27729), and the two organizations are cooperating. ISNI will uniquely identify contributors to books, television programmes, and newspapers, and has reserved a block of identifiers for use by ORCID, in the range 0000-0001-5000-0007 to 0000-0003-5000-0001. It is therefore possible for a person to legitimately have both an ISNI and an ORCID ID – effectively, two ISNIs.

Both ORCID and ISNI use 16-character identifiers, using the digits 0–9, and separated into groups of four by hyphens. The final character, which may also be a letter "X" representing the value "10" (for example, Stephen Hawking's ORCID ID is https://orcid.org/0000-0002-9079-593X), is a MOD 11-2 check digit conforming to the ISO/IEC 7064:2003 standard.

Members, sponsors and registrants 
By the end of 2013 ORCID had 111 member organizations and over 460,000 registrants. On 15 November 2014, ORCID announced the one-millionth registration, and on 20 November 2020 the ten-millionth registration. , ORCID reported 1258 member organizations and 14,727,479 live accounts. The organizational members include many research institutions such as Caltech and Cornell University, and publishers such as Elsevier, Springer, Wiley and Nature Publishing Group. There are also commercial companies including Thomson Reuters, academic societies and funding bodies.

Grant-making bodies such as the Wellcome Trust (a charitable foundation) have also begun to mandate that applicants for funding provide an ORCID identifier.

National implementations 
	 
In several countries, consortia, including government bodies as partners, are operating at a national level to implement ORCID. In Australia, the government's National Health and Medical Research Council (NHMRC) and Australian Research Council (ARC) "encourage all researchers applying for funding to have an ORCID identifier". The French scientific article repository HAL is also inviting its users to enter their ORCID ID.

Integrations 

Both Wikipedia and Wikidata include pages with ORCID identifiers.

As of 2014 in addition to members and sponsors, journals, publishers, and other services have or had included ORCID in their workflows or databases. 2014 to 2016 some online services created tools for exporting data to, or importing data from, ORCID.

In October 2015, DataCite, Crossref and ORCID announced that the former organisations would update ORCID records, "when an ORCID identifier is found in newly registered DOI names".

Some ORCID data may also be retrieved as RDF/XML, RDF Turtle, XML or JSON. ORCID uses GitHub as its code repository.

See also 

 Authority control
 Digital Author Identifier (DAI)
 List of academic databases and search engines
 OpenID
 Ringgold identifier (RIN)
 Virtual International Authority File (VIAF)

References

External links 
 
 

Academic publishing
Identifiers
Technical communication
2012 introductions
Library cataloging and classification
Scholarly communication
Companies based in Bethesda, Maryland